is a Japanese football player. She plays for Albirex Niigata and formerly played for the Japan national team.

Club career
Kamionobe was born in Yokohama on 15 March 1986. After graduating from Musashigaoka College, she joined Albirex Niigata in 2006. She was selected in the Best Eleven 5 times (2009, 2010, 2014, 2015 and 2016).

International career
On 1 August 2009, Kamionobe debuted for the Japan national team against France. She was a member of Japan's squad for the 2011 and 2015 World Cups. Japan won the World Cup in 2011 and came second in 2015. In Asia, she was also a squad member at the 2010 Asian Games and the 2014 Asian Cup. Japan won the championship at both tournaments. She played 34 games and scored 2 goals for Japan until 2016.

National team statistics

Intetnational goals

References

External links

Japan Football Association

1986 births
Living people
Association football people from Kanagawa Prefecture
Japanese women's footballers
Japan women's international footballers
Nadeshiko League players
Albirex Niigata Ladies players
FIFA Women's World Cup-winning players
2011 FIFA Women's World Cup players
2015 FIFA Women's World Cup players
Asian Games medalists in football
Asian Games gold medalists for Japan
Medalists at the 2010 Asian Games
Footballers at the 2010 Asian Games
Women's association football midfielders